Tom Schuette (born January 10, 1945) was a Canadian football player who played for the Ottawa Rough Riders. He won the Grey Cup in 1968, 1969, 1973, and 1976. He previously played college football at Indiana University.

References

1945 births
Living people
American football offensive linemen
Canadian football offensive linemen
American players of Canadian football
Indiana Hoosiers football players
Ottawa Rough Riders players
Sportspeople from East St. Louis, Illinois
Players of American football from Illinois